Puerto Rico Highway 690 (PR-690) is a north–south road located entirely in the municipality of Vega Alta, Puerto Rico.

Major intersections

Related route

Puerto Rico Highway 6690 (PR-6690) is a spur route that goes to PR-693 from PR-690 near Cerro Gordo Beach.

See also

 List of highways numbered 690

References

External links
 

690
Vega Alta, Puerto Rico